Elections to West Dunbartonshire Council were held on 3 May 2007, the same day as the other Scottish local government elections and the Scottish Parliament general election. The election was the first one using six new wards created as a result of the Local Governance (Scotland) Act 2004, each ward will elect three or four councillors using the single transferable vote system form of proportional representation. The new wards replace 22 single-member wards which used the plurality (first past the post) system of election.

Election results

Ward results

Changes Since 2007 Election
†On 3 November 2008, Clydebank Waterfront Cllr Marie McNair resigned from the Labour Party and then sat as an Independent.
††On 2 February 2009, Clydebank Central Cllr Willie McLaughlin resigned from the Labour Party and sat as an Independent until 30 March 2011, when he sat as a member of Ban Bankers' Bonuses.

2007-2011 by-elections 
Labour's Margaret Bootland resigned due to ill health in December 2010. The by-election was won by Labour's Lawrence O'Neill on 3 March 2011

References

External links
 Council website

2007
2007 Scottish local elections
21st century in West Dunbartonshire